American actor, director, and producer Robert Duvall has had an extensive career in film and television since he first appeared in an episode of Armstrong Circle Theatre in 1959. His television work during the 1960s includes Route 66 (1961), Alfred Hitchcock Presents (1962), The Twilight Zone (1963), The Outer Limits (1964), The F.B.I. (1965–1969), and The Mod Squad (1969). He was then cast as General Dwight D. Eisenhower in the 1979 miniseries Ike. In 1989, he played Augustus "Gus" McCrae alongside Tommy Lee Jones in the epic Western adventure television miniseries Lonesome Dove. The role earned him a Golden Globe Award for Best Actor – Miniseries or Television Film. Three years later, he portrayed Georgian revolutionary and Soviet political leader Joseph Stalin in the television film Stalin (1992), which earned him another Golden Globe Award for Best Actor in a Television Film.

Duvall's first film role was as Boo Radley in the 1962 film To Kill a Mockingbird with Gregory Peck. His other roles in the 1960s included Bullitt with Steve McQueen (1968) and True Grit with John Wayne (1969). In the 1970s, he played Major Frank Burns in M*A*S*H (1970), Tom Hagen in The Godfather (1972) and The Godfather Part II (1974), Jesse James in The Great Northfield Minnesota Raid (1972), Dr. Watson in The Seven-Per-Cent Solution (1976), Bull Meechum in The Great Santini (1979) and as Lieutenant Colonel Bill Kilgore in Apocalypse Now (1979).

In 1983, Duvall was cast as Mac Sledge in the drama film Tender Mercies, which earned him an Academy Award and Golden Globe for Best Actor. He went on to co-star in the films The Natural with Robert Redford (1984), Days of Thunder with Tom Cruise (1990), as Joseph Pulitzer in Newsies with Christian Bale (1992), Something to Talk About with Julia Roberts (1995), Sling Blade with Billy Bob Thornton (1996), A Family Thing with James Earl Jones (1996), Phenomenon with John Travolta (1996), and Deep Impact with Téa Leoni (1998). For his role in the 1998 film A Civil Action again with Travolta, he won a SAG Award for Outstanding Performance by a Male Actor in a Supporting Role.

In the 2000s, Duvall had notable roles in the films Gone in 60 Seconds opposite Nicolas Cage (2000), Secondhand Lions co-starring with Michael Caine (2003), Open Range co-starring with Kevin Costner (2003) and in the comedy film Four Christmases opposite Vince Vaughn (2008). He starred in and executive produced the 2006 Western television miniseries, Broken Trail. For that, he won two Emmy Awards, one for Outstanding Lead Actor In A Miniseries Or A Movie and the other for Outstanding Miniseries which he shared with the other producers. In 2012, he reunited with Tom Cruise after 22 years in the action thriller film Jack Reacher where he played the character Cash. In 2014, he co-starred with Robert Downey Jr. in the legal drama film The Judge where he played Judge Joseph Palmer, the father of Downey's character.

Film

Television

Video games 
 The Godfather (2006) – voice role of Tom Hagen
 The Godfather II (2009) – voice role of Tom Hagen

See also
List of awards and nominations received by Robert Duvall

Sources

References

External links 
 

Duvall, Robert
Duvall Robert
Duvall, Robert